is a Prefectural Natural Park in Akita Prefecture, Japan.

See also
 National Parks of Japan
 Parks and gardens in Akita Prefecture

References

Parks and gardens in Akita Prefecture
Protected areas established in 1972
1972 establishments in Japan
Akita (city)